It's a Compton Thang! is the debut studio album by American gangsta rap group Compton's Most Wanted. It was released in 1990 through Orpheus Records.

Recording sessions took place at Thllss Studios in Los Angeles with audio engineer Mike "Webeboomindashit" Edwards and producers DJ Slip and The Unknown DJ. It was mastered at The Other Room in Queens, New York, by Jack Skinner. Ant Capone was supposed to be part of the group, but left prior to this album due to contractual and managing issues, and was replaced by DJ Mike T.

The album peaked at number 133 on the Billboard 200 and at number 32 on the Top R&B/Hip-Hop Albums chart in the United States.

Critical reception
Old School Rap and Hip-hop wrote that "the true beauty of It's a Compton Thang is the initial synthesis of former electro legend the Unknown DJ with future gangsta icon MC Eiht as well as the pleasant reminder that West Coast gangsta rap was once more about old-fashioned fun than cheap thrills." The Washington Post thought that the album "lacks the sonic punch and the verbal verve of N.W.A."

Track listing

Personnel
Aaron Tyler – lyrics, vocals
Terry Keith Allen – producer, arranger
Michael Bryant – scratches
Andre Manuel – keyboards, producer, arranger, executive producer
Darryl "Lyrrad" Davis – additional keyboards, design
Mike "Webeboomindashit" Edwards – engineering
Jack Skinner – mastering
Henry Marquez – art direction
Phil Bedel – photography
Weldon Cochren – production coordinator
Lynda Simmons – project coordinator

Charts

References

External links

1990 debut albums
Compton's Most Wanted albums